QQK may refer to:
 A reserved Q code for maritime use
 London King's Cross railway station (IATA railway code)
 Armed Forces of the Republic of Kazakhstan (Qazaqstannyñ Qarūly küshteri)